Barak is a moshav in northern Israel. Located in the Ta'anakh region, it falls under the jurisdiction of Gilboa Regional Council.

History
The moshav was founded in 1956 by Moroccan Jewish immigrants as part of the program to settle the Ta'anakh region. The name "Barak" is derived from the character Barak in the Book of Judges (f.e. chapter 4, vers 6), who defeated the enemy king Sisera near the location of the moshav.

Notable residents

 Joaquin Szuchman (born 1995), Israeli-Argentinian basketball player in the Israel Basketball Premier League

References

Moshavim
Populated places in Northern District (Israel)
1956 establishments in Israel
Populated places established in 1956
Moroccan-Jewish culture in Israel